Giacomo Antonio Francesco Paolo Michele Insanguine (also called Giacomo Monopoli after his birthplace Monopoli; 22 March 1728 – 1 February 1795) was an Italian composer, organist, and music educator. He was the last director (primo maestro) of the conservatoire of Sant'Onofrio in Naples, which merged in 1795, two years after Insanguine's death in Naples, with the conservatoire of Santa Maria di Loreto.
The most important and up-to-date critical study on him was recently published in an Anthology of unpublished eighteenth-century music in Puglia.

References

1728 births
1793 deaths
Italian male classical composers
Italian organists
Male organists
Italian opera composers
Male opera composers
18th-century Italian composers
18th-century Italian male musicians
18th-century keyboardists